Šušure, is a village in Serbia, located in the municipality of Sjenica, district of Zlatibor. In 2002, it had 25 inhabitants, all Serbs.

Notes and references

See also 

 List of cities, towns and villages in Serbia (N-Z)
 List of cities in Serbia

External links 
 Satellite view of Šušure
 Šušure

Populated places in Zlatibor District